Utansjö is a settlement in Härnösand Municipality, Västernorrland County, Sweden. Until 2015, it was classified by Statistics Sweden as a locality (tätort), with 209 inhabitants in 2010. Since 2015, it is regarded as two smaller localities (småorter), with 92 and 112 inhabitants each in 2015. It is located close to the Höga Kusten Bridge.

References

External links
 http://www.utansjö.se/ (only in swedish so far) 

Populated places in Härnösand Municipality
Ångermanland